The Alteromonadaceae are a family of Pseudomonadota.  They are now one of several families in the order Alteromonadales, including Alteromonas and its closest relatives. Species of this family are mostly rod-like shaped and motile by using one polar flagellum.

References

External links
Alteromonadaceae LPSN - List of Prokaryotic names with Standing in Nomenclature

Alteromonadales